Francis Bullingham (1554 – ca. 1636), of the Cathedral Close, Lincoln was an English politician.

Bullingham was the son of Nicholas Bullingham, Bishop of Lincoln then Worcester. He matriculated at Jesus College, Cambridge in 1568, but transferred to King's College, Cambridge, where he studied 1569–1572, and was admitted to Gray's Inn in 1576.

He was a Member (MP) of the Parliament of England for Lincoln in 1601 and Boston in 1604.

References

1554 births
1636 deaths
People from Lincoln, England
Alumni of Jesus College, Cambridge
Alumni of King's College, Cambridge
Members of Gray's Inn
English MPs 1601
English MPs 1604–1611